Ballymena is a former local government district with borough status in Northern Ireland. It was one of twenty-six districts created on 1 October 1973 and covered the town of Ballymena and the surrounding area which includes small towns including Broughshane, Cullybackey, Galgorm, Ahoghill and Portglenone. The borough had a central location within Northern Ireland and was served by the M2 motorway and with a station on the Belfast-Derry/Londonderry railway line. As of 2015 it has been replaced by Mid and East Antrim Borough Council.

Parliamentary and assembly representation
Together with the neighbouring Borough of Ballymoney and part of the District of Moyle, it formed the North Antrim constituency for elections to the Westminster Parliament and Northern Ireland Assembly.

See also
Local government in Northern Ireland

References

External links

Ballymena Borough Council

Politics of County Antrim
Ballymena
Districts of Northern Ireland, 1972–2015
Boroughs of Northern Ireland